Abdul Majeed Al-Mosawi (born 16 March 1962) is a Kuwaiti sprinter. He competed in the men's 100 metres at the 1980 Summer Olympics.

References

1962 births
Living people
Athletes (track and field) at the 1980 Summer Olympics
Kuwaiti male sprinters
Olympic athletes of Kuwait
Place of birth missing (living people)